Zimino is a rural locality (a selo) and the administrative center of Ziminsky Selsoviet, Rebrikhinsky District, Altai Krai, Russia. The population was 997 as of 2013. There are 11 streets.

Geography 
Zimino is located 32 km southeast of Rebrikha (the district's administrative centre) by road. Ploskoseminsky is the nearest rural locality.

References 

Rural localities in Rebrikhinsky District